Awakenings is a 1990 American drama film directed by Penny Marshall. It is written by Steven Zaillian, who based his screenplay on Oliver Sacks's 1973 memoir Awakenings. It tells the story of neurologist Dr. Malcolm Sayer (Robin Williams), who is based on Sacks, who discovers the beneficial effects of the drug L-Dopa in 1969. He administers it to catatonic patients who survived the 1917–1928 epidemic of encephalitis lethargica. Leonard Lowe (Robert de Niro) and the rest of the patients are awakened after decades and have to deal with a new life in a new time. Julie Kavner, Ruth Nelson, John Heard, Penelope Ann Miller, Peter Stormare, and Max von Sydow also star.

Awakenings was produced by Walter Parkes and Lawrence Lasker, who first encountered Sacks's book as undergraduates at Yale and optioned it a few years later. The film was a critical and commercial success, earning $108.7 million on a $29 million budget, and was nominated for three Academy Awards.

Plot
In 1969, Dr. Malcolm Sayer is a dedicated and caring physician at a local hospital in the Bronx borough of New York City. After working extensively with the catatonic patients who survived the 1917–1928 epidemic of encephalitis lethargica, Sayer discovers certain stimuli will reach beyond the patients' respective catatonic states; actions such as catching a ball, hearing familiar music, being called by their name, and enjoying human touch, all have unique effects on particular patients and offer a glimpse into their worlds. Patient Leonard Lowe seems to remain unmoved, but Sayer learns that Leonard is able to communicate with him by using a Ouija board.

After attending a lecture at a conference on the drug L-Dopa and its success for patients with Parkinson's disease, Sayer believes the drug may offer a breakthrough for his own group of patients. A trial run with Leonard yields astounding results: Leonard completely "awakens" from his catatonic state. This success inspires Sayer to ask for funding from donors so that all the catatonic patients can receive the L-Dopa medication and gain "awakenings" to reality and the present.

Meanwhile, Leonard is adjusting to his new life and becomes romantically interested in Paula, the daughter of another hospital patient. Leonard begins to chafe at the restrictions placed upon him as a patient of the hospital, desiring the freedom to come and go as he pleases. He stirs up a revolt by arguing his case to Sayer and the hospital administration. Sayer notices that as Leonard grows more agitated, a number of facial and body tics are starting to manifest, which Leonard has difficulty controlling.

Although Sayer and the hospital staff are thrilled by the success of L-Dopa with this group of patients, they soon learn that it is a temporary result. As the first to "awaken", Leonard is also the first to demonstrate the limited duration of this period of "awakening". Leonard's tics grow more and more prominent, and he starts to shuffle more as he walks. All of the patients are forced to witness what will eventually happen to them. He soon begins to have full body spasms and can hardly move. Leonard puts up well with the pain, and asks Sayer to film him, in hopes that he would someday contribute to research that may eventually help others. Leonard acknowledges what is happening to him and has a last lunch with Paula, where he tells her he cannot see her anymore. When he is about to leave, Paula dances with him. For this short period of time, his spasms disappear. Leonard and Sayer reconcile their differences, but Leonard returns to his catatonic state soon after. The other patients' fears are similarly realized as each eventually returns to catatonia, no matter how much their L-Dopa dosages are increased.

Sayer tells a group of grant donors to the hospital that although the "awakening" did not last, another kindone of learning to appreciate and live lifetook place. For example, he overcomes his painful shyness and asks Nurse Eleanor Costello to go out for coffee, many months after he had declined a similar invitation from her. The nurses now treat the catatonic patients with more respect and care, and Paula is shown visiting Leonard. The film ends with Sayer standing over Leonard behind a Ouija board, with his hands on Leonard's hands, which are on the planchette. "Let's begin," Sayer says.

Cast

 Robert De Niro as Leonard Lowe
 Robin Williams as Dr. Malcolm Sayer
 Julie Kavner as Eleanor Costello
 John Heard as Dr. Kaufman
 Penelope Ann Miller as Paula
 Max von Sydow as Dr. Peter Ingham
 Vincent Pastore as Ward #5 Patient #6
 Ruth Nelson as Mrs. Lowe
 Alice Drummond as Lucy
 Judith Malina as Rose
 George Martin as Frank
 Anne Meara as Miriam
 Mary Alice as Nurse Margaret
 Richard Libertini as Sidney
 Keith Diamond as Anthony
 Peter Stormare as unsympathetic neuro-chemist lecturer
 Bradley Whitford as Dr. Tyler
 Dexter Gordon as Rolando
 Vin Diesel as Orderly (uncredited)

Production

Casting
On September 15, 1989, Liz Smith reported that those being considered for the role of Leonard Lowe's mother were Kaye Ballard, Shelley Winters, and Anne Jackson; not quite three weeks later, Newsday named Nancy Marchand as the leading contender. However, it was not until late January of the following year—more than three quarters of the way through the film's four-month shooting schedule—that the matter was seemingly resolved, when the February 1990 issue of Premiere magazine published a widely cited story, belatedly informing fans that not only had Winters landed the role, but that she'd been targeted at De Niro's request and had sealed the deal by means of some unabashed résumé-flexing (for the benefit, as we can now surmise, of veteran casting director Bonnie Timmermann):

Notwithstanding Liz Smith, Newsday and even Premiere'''s seemingly definitive report (which—minus any mention of the specific film being discussed—would be periodically reiterated and ultimately embellished in subsequent years),Cronin, Brian (July 6, 2022). "Is the Famous Shelley Winters Oscar Story Really True?". CBR. Retrieved February 6, 2023. the film as finally released in December 1990 featured neither Winters—whose early dismissal evidently resulted from continuing attempts to pull rank on director Penny MarshallBaxter, John (2003). De Niro: An Autobiography. London: HarperCollinsPublishers. p. 289. .—nor any of the other previously publicized candidates (nor at least two others, Jo Van Fleet and Teresa Wright, identified in subsequent accounts),Spoto, Donald (2016). A Girl's Got to Breathe: The Life of Teresa Wright. Jackson: University Press of Mississippi. . but rather the then-85-year-old Group Theater alumnus Ruth Nelson, giving a well-received performance in what would prove her final feature film. "As Leonard's mother," writes Wall Street Journal critic Julie Salamon, "Nelson achieves a wrenching beauty that stands out even among these exceptional actors doing exceptional things." In her 2012 memoir, Penny Marshall recalled:

Filming
Principal photography for Awakenings began on October 16, 1989, at the Kingsboro Psychiatric Center in Brooklyn, New York, which was operating, and lasted until February 16, 1990. According to Williams, actual patients were used in the filming of the movie.  In addition to Kingsboro, sequences were also filmed at the New York Botanical Garden, Julia Richman High School, the Casa Galicia, and Park Slope, Brooklyn.

ReceptionAwakenings opened in limited release on December 22, 1990, with an opening weekend gross of $417,076. The film expanded to a wide release on January 11, 1991, opening in second place behind Home Alones ninth weekend, with $8,306,532. It went on to gross $52.1 million in the United States and Canada and $56.6 million internationally, for a worldwide total of $108.7 million.

Critical responseAwakenings received positive reviews from critics. Review aggregator Rotten Tomatoes reports that 86% of 36 film critics have given the film a positive review, with a rating average of 6.7/10. Its consensus states "Elevated by some of Robin Williams' finest non-comedic work and a strong performance from Robert De Niro, Awakenings skirts the edges of melodrama, then soars above it." Metacritic, which assigns a weighted average score out of 100 to reviews from mainstream critics, gives the film a score of 74 based on 18 reviews. Audiences surveyed by CinemaScore gave the film a grade "A" on scale of A to F.

Roger Ebert of the Chicago Sun-Times gave the film a four-out-of-four star rating, writing,

Owen Gleiberman of Entertainment Weekly praised the film's performances, citing,

Oliver Sacks, the author of the memoir on which the film is based, "was pleased with a great deal of [the film]," explaining,

Desson Howe of The Washington Post felt the film's tragic aspects did not live up to the strength in its humor, saying that

Similarly, Janet Maslin of The New York Times'' concluded her review stating,

Accolades
The film was nominated for three Academy Awards, including: the Academy Award for Best Picture, the Academy Award for Best Adapted Screenplay, and the Academy Award for Best Actor (Robert De Niro). Robin Williams was also nominated at the 48th Golden Globe Awards for Best Actor in a Motion Picture Drama.

Notes

References

External links

 
 
 
 
 

1990 films
1990 drama films
American drama films
Columbia Pictures films
1990s English-language films
Films scored by Randy Newman
Drama films based on actual events
Films based on non-fiction books
Films directed by Penny Marshall
Films set in 1969
Films set in psychiatric hospitals
Films shot in New York City
Films set in the Bronx
Films with screenplays by Steven Zaillian
Medical-themed films
Films based on works by Oliver Sacks
Films produced by Walter F. Parkes
People who awoke from permanent coma like states
1990s American films